Virginian Railway Yard Historic District is a national historic district  located at Princeton, Mercer County, West Virginia.  The district includes 14 contributing buildings, 1 contributing site, and 1 contributing structure related to the Virginian Railway property at Princeton. Many date to the founding of the railway in 1905–1909, with others related to a physical improvements campaign in the 1920s.  A number of the buildings are a vernacular interpretation of the Romanesque Revival style.  They include the Locomotive Erecting Shop, transfer table pit (c. 1905), machine shop foundations, three water pump houses (c. 1910–1920), North Repair Shop (c. 1925), Brick Storehouse (c. 1940), and Car Wheel Shop (c. 1905).

It was listed on the National Register of Historic Places in 2003.

References

Commercial buildings on the National Register of Historic Places in West Virginia
Historic districts in Mercer County, West Virginia
Romanesque Revival architecture in West Virginia
Princeton, West Virginia
National Register of Historic Places in Mercer County, West Virginia
Historic districts on the National Register of Historic Places in West Virginia